Pradeep Chawla (born 19 October 1980) is an Indian former cricketer. He played 24 first-class matches for Delhi between 2000 and 2005.

See also
 List of Delhi cricketers

References

External links
 

1980 births
Living people
Indian cricketers
Delhi cricketers
Cricketers from Delhi